Bapu Padmanabha, also known as Bapu Flute, is a musician and composer who performs Hindustani classical music on his bansuri, a type of bamboo flute. He was born on 18 November 1978 in Harihar which is in Davanagere District of Karnataka state in India.

Musical style and impact
Adept in Hindustani Classical Music, Mantra Chantings, New Age, Film Score, Ambient Music, and World Music, Bapu is noted for composing music for the National Award Winner film Allama and Bapu's love for experimenting with Mantra sounds. Bapu used Carnatic, Hindustani, and Lounge music as the tools of expression for Allama Prabhu's Vachanas. Bapu's soft and restrained musical style has varied meditative albums to his credit.

A Music C.D. entitled Music as Therapy by Bapu Padmanabha of Harihar, Karnataka State was released by External Affairs Government of India in order to acquaint foreign cultural delegates with Indian classical music.

Film music

Bapu Padmanabha won the National Film Award for Best Music Direction for the film Allama Prabhu. Bapu composed music for the film Allama Prabhu produced by Yajaman Enterprises, M.D. SriHari, L. Khoday Khoday Group, and directed by T. S. Nagabharana.

References

1978 births
Living people
Musicians from Karnataka
People from Davanagere district
Indian flautists
Indian male classical musicians
Kannada film score composers
Best Music Direction National Film Award winners
Best Background Score National Film Award winners
Indian male film score composers
Hindustani instrumentalists
Bansuri players
21st-century male musicians
21st-century flautists